Knoxfield is a suburb in Melbourne, Victoria, Australia, 27 km east of Melbourne's Central Business District, located within the City of Knox local government area. Knoxfield recorded a population of 7,645 at the 2021 census.

History

Knoxfield is named after Sir George Hodges Knox, former local and state parliamentarian.

Development of the area dates primarily from the 1950s and rapid growth took place during the 1960s and 1970s. Knoxfield Post Office opened on 31 July 1961 as the suburb was developed. The northern area of Knoxfield experienced substantial growth from the 1970s. The population increased during the early 1990s, and then was relatively stable from the mid-1990s, a result of new dwellings being added to the area. There has been a recent decline in the average number of persons living in each dwelling.

Knoxfield is unique, as most of the streets are named after the residents who lived there. Some people are still living in the streets that were named after them.

Today

Knoxfield has a small industrial area mainly concerned with the production and sale of food. A small number of graphic design businesses and printeries make their home in Knoxfield. The suburb is well known for the Knox Athletics Track and the Gilbert Reserve. Gilbert Reserve is quite large, and regularly holds softball and baseball matches. Knoxfield also boasts a large BMX track, which is often used for BMX competitions and the R.D. Egan-Lee Reserve which is regularly used by walkers and hosts a soccer club. The track is also open for use by the public. Next to Gilbert Reserve is a local skatepark which was accessible from early 2008. There is a Coles Express service station on the corner of Ferntree Gully Road and Scoresby road which sells fuel as well as a small selection from the Coles Supermarket range.

Also in Knoxfield, there is the Carrington Park Leisure Centre, which is mainly used for gymnastics and fitness. It has also hosted state and national competitions. 
A family play centre called Big Slide is located in Knoxfield.
The Eastern Sports Centre also calls Knoxfield home and hosts futsal, indoor soccer, netball, and cricket. There are also a number of decorated bus shelters which are the creation of the Placemakers.

The north east part of Knoxfield, incorporating such roads as Amelia Street, Bunnett Road and Hugh Street, is sometimes referred to as the French quarter of Knoxfield due to its magnificent houses and proximity to both Burwood Highway and Scoresby Road, both famous roads that run through the city of Paris.

Demographics

In the 2016 Census, there were 7,462 people in Knoxfield. 64.1% of people were born in Australia. The next most common countries of birth were China 5.3%, England 3.6%, India 2.5%, Malaysia 2.5% and Sri Lanka 2.4%. 69.5% of people spoke only English at home. Other languages spoken at home included Mandarin 7.2%, Cantonese 3.7% and Sinhalese 1.9%. The most common responses for religion were No Religion 33.4%, Catholic 18.5% and Anglican 8.8%.

Education

Schools in Knoxfield include Fairhills High School, Knox Park Primary School and Carrington Primary School (formerly Knoxfield Primary School). Knoxfield Primary School merged with Scoresby Heights Primary School in 1994 to create Carrington Primary School.

Shopping in Knoxfield

Knoxfield is home to two shopping strips. A medium shopping strip known as the Knoxfield Shops on Ferntree Gully road, and the Anne Road shops on Anne Road.

Knoxfield shops
Knoxfield is home to a small shopping strip, with shops including Dosa Joy AAA Supplements, The Gully Pizza House, Knoxfield Pharmacy, Together Medical Family Practice, Knoxfield Florist, Gully Fish & Grill, Knoxfield Dental Care, Knoxfield IGA Plus Liquor, Lunch Break Deli Cafe, Knoxfield General Practice Dr. Y.C. Liow, healing hands massage, Strive for Excellence Tutoring, Simmonds Family Meats & Seafood, Knoxfield Newsagency Post Office & The Lott Tatts, Knoxfield Hot Bread, Knoxfield Milk Bar, Wok'd Gourmet Chinese Food, Knoxfield Thai restaurant, Hills Physiotherapy, Knoxfield Chicken Bar, And a A'blaze Hair Artistry hairdresser

Anne Road shops
There is also a small shopping strip on Anne Road, with shops including the Hammad Mohamad Milkbar, Al Pacino's Pizzeria, Cleo's Quality Fish & Chips, Antique Tool Shed, Knox Spice Corner, Centre of Wellbeing, and the Shikarnya Hair Salon.

Sport in Knoxfield

Knoxfield has a rich sporting culture and there are several sporting clubs who call the various sports fields, tracks and courses in Knoxfield home. There are also other sporting facilities including a BMX track, a leisure centre, and skate park.

Golfers play at the course of the Waterford Valley Golf Course on Bunjil Way.

The Knoxfield Knights Cricket Club is based at Carrington Park.

The Knox Athletics Track hosts a variety of sport and events including Little Athletics and the Knox Athletics Club

Gilbert Reserve is home to the Knox & District Softball Association and its related teams  as well as The Knox Falcons Baseball Club 

Next to Gilbert Park is the Knox Skate and BMX Park  which is regularly used by skateboarders, bikers, and scooter riders.

Knoxfield also boasts a large BMX track, which is often used for BMX competitions. The track is also open for use by the public and is regularly attending by BMX and biking enthusiasts of all ages.

The R.D. Egan-Lee Reserve is also in Knoxfield and is home to the Knox City Soccer Club Ltd

Leisure Centre

The Carrington Park Leisure Centre is mainly used for gymnastics and fitness. It has hosted various state and national competitions.
It is also the home of the Omega Trampoline Club, Ferntree Gully Basketball Club, Knox Table Tennis Club and Chinese Elderly Citizens Club. It also boasts facilities such as meeting rooms, a kitchen, disabled access, toilet and car parking, change rooms, trampoline facilities, squash courts and boxing facilities.

Knoxfield is a home for two Scouts groups: 1st Knoxfield group located in Carrington Reserve, and 2nd Knoxfield group located in R.D. Egan-Lee Reserve

References

External links
 Knoxfield Knights Cricket Club
 Carrington Park Leisure Centre
 Knoxfield BMX
 Knox Skate Park
 Knox Baseball
 Knox & District Softball Association
 Big Slide Family Play Centre
 Eastern Indoor Sports Centre
 Knoxfield Florist
 Diamonds & Lace Lingerie
 Centre of Wellbeing

Suburbs of Melbourne
Suburbs of the City of Knox